The Trtar-Krtolin wind farm is a wind farm located in Croatia. With a capacity of 11.2 MW, it was constructed in 2006. It is composed of 14 Enercon E48/800 turbines, with a capacity of 800 kW each.

References 

Wind farms
2006 establishments in Croatia